Blanca Delfina Soto Benavides  is a Mexican actress, model and beauty pageant titleholder who was crowned Nuestra Belleza Mundo México 1997.

Career
Soto competed in the national beauty pageant Nuestra Belleza México in 1997, representing her home state of Nuevo León. That same year, Soto became Miss Mexico World and represented her country in the international beauty contest Vina Del Mar in Chile.

Soto's first role as an actress was in the short film La Vida Blanca, which she co-produced with then-husband Jack Hartnett, who wrote and directed as well. For the role, she received her first award for Best Actress. Soto then had supporting roles in films such as: "Divina Confusion", Deep in the Valley and Dinner for Schmucks. She starred in Venevisión's telenovelas in collaboration with Univision; Eva Luna (2010–2011) as Eva Gonzalez and El Talismán (2012) as Camila Nájera. Soto starred with Fernando Colunga in Juan Osorio's telenovela; Porque el amor manda which was broadcast in Mexico from 2012 to 2013.

She appeared in Billy Currington's music video "Must Be Doin' Somethin' Right" (winner of sexiest video of the year at the CMA). As a model, Soto has been featured in advertisements for GAP, LensCrafters, Venus Swimwear, Avon, Andrea, Charriol, Foley's, Yellowbook, Zara, Garnier and Budweiser.

Personal life
Soto married American actor Jack Hartnett in 2006. She announced their separation on 17 November 2011 on her Twitter account.

Filmography

As producer

Films

Television

Theater

Credits as a dubbing actress

Appearances in music videos

Awards and nominations

Other awards and recognitions

References

External links
 Official Twitter page of Blanca Soto
 

1979 births
Living people
Mexican telenovela actresses
Mexican film actresses
Mexican stage actresses
Mexican voice actresses
Mexican female models
Actresses from Monterrey
20th-century Mexican actresses
21st-century Mexican actresses
Miss World 1997 delegates
Nuestra Belleza México winners
Beauty pageant contestants from Monterrey